The Sōbu Line (Rapid) is a railway service on the Sōbu Main Line in Tokyo and Chiba Prefecture, Japan, operated by  East Japan Railway Company (JR East). It connects Tokyo Station in Chūō, Tokyo with Chiba Station in Chūō-ku, Chiba via the cities of Ichikawa, Funabashi, and Narashino.

Services 
During weekday morning peak periods Tokyo-bound trains arrive once every 3.2 minutes; this is reduced to 10 Chiba-bound trains per hour during weekday evening peak periods. At other times there are approximately six trains per hour. There are many through services operated onto other lines.

Commuter rapid trains, operated during weekday peak periods in the mornings and evenings, make fewer stops than normal rapid trains. There are two Zushi-bound trains from Narita in the morning and a single Narita-bound train from Tokyo in the evening.

For information on the Narita Express, Shiosai, and other limited express services, see their respective articles.

Trains also travel through beyond Chiba to as far as:
  on the Sotobō Line
  on the Uchibō Line
  via  on the Narita Line
  on the Kashima Line
  on the Sōbu Main Line

Past services

Home Liner Chiba 

Before 16 March 2019, there were five Home Liner Chiba commuter liner services that operated every weekday evening, four of which started from Tokyo and another which started at Shinjuku. 

Stations served:

(Shinjuku – Akihabara) / Tokyo – Tsudanuma – Inage – Chiba

Limited Express Ayame

Station list 
 For information on local services between Kinshichō and Chiba, see the Chūō-Sōbu Line article.
 Trains stop at stations marked "●" and pass those marked "｜".

Note: Special Rapid service was discontinued on 4 March 2017.

Rolling stock

Rapid service 
 E217 series (from December 1994)
 E235-1000 series (from 21 December 2020)

Limited express service 
 255 series (Shiosai)
 E257 series (Shiosai)
 E259 series (Narita Express)

Former rolling stock 
 113 series (from October 1980 to December 1999)

History 
On 20 August 2016, station numbering was introduced with stations being assigned station numbers between JO19 and JO28. Numbers increase towards in the eastbound direction towards Chiba.

References

External links

 Stations of the Sōbu Line (Rapid) (unofficial) 

Lines of East Japan Railway Company
Railway lines in Tokyo
Railway lines in Chiba Prefecture
Sōbu Main Line
1067 mm gauge railways in Japan
Railway lines opened in 1972
1972 establishments in Japan